The Lusitanians were an Indo-European speaking people living in the west of the Iberian Peninsula prior to its conquest by the Roman Republic and the subsequent incorporation of the territory into the Roman province of Lusitania.

History

Origins 

Frontinus mentions Lusitanian leader Viriathus as the leader of the Celtiberians, in their war against the Romans. 
The Greco-Roman historian Diodorus Siculus attributed them a name of another Celtic tribe: "Those who are called Lusitanians are the bravest of all Cimbri", often thought of as Germanic. The Lusitanians were also called Belitanians, according to the diviner Artemidorus. Strabo differentiated the Lusitanians from the Iberian tribes and called them Celts who had been known as Oestriminis in ancient times. On the other hand, Pliny the Elder and Pomponius Mela distinguished the Lusitanians from neighboring Celtic groups like the Artabrians in their geographical writings.

The original Roman province of Lusitania briefly included the territories of Asturia and Gallaecia, but these were soon ceded to the jurisdiction of the Provincia Tarraconensis in the north, while the south remained the Provincia Lusitania et Vettones. After this, Lusitania's northern border was along the Douro River, while its eastern border passed through Salmantica and Caesarobriga to the Anas (Guadiana) river.

Wars with Rome 

Lusitanian mercenaries fought for Carthage between the years 218 and 201 BC, during the Second Punic War against Rome. Silius Italicus describes them as forming a combined contingent with the Gallaeci and being led both by a commander named Viriathus (not to be confused with the similarly named chieftain). According to Livy, Lusitanian and Celtiberian cavalry performed raids in the north of Italy whenever the terrain was too rough for Hannibal's famed Numidian cavalry.

Since 193 BC, the Lusitanians had been fighting the Romans in Hispania. In 150 BC, they were defeated by Praetor Servius Galba: springing a treacherous trap, he killed 9,000 Lusitanians and later sold 20,000 more as slaves in Gaul (modern France). This massacre would not be forgotten by Viriathus, who three years later (147 BC) would become the leader of the Lusitanians, and severely damaged the Roman rule in Lusitania and beyond. In 139 BC, Viriathus was betrayed and killed in his sleep by three of his companions (who had been sent as emissaries to the Romans), Audax, Ditalcus and Minurus, bribed by Marcus Popillius Laenas (although they were Viriathus warrior companions they were not Lusitanians themselves, they seem to have been Turdetanians, or from other people that was not Lusitanian). However, when the three returned to receive their reward from the Romans, the Consul Quintus Servilius Caepio ordered their execution, declaring, "Rome does not pay traitors".

Romanization 
After the death of Viriathus, the Lusitanians kept fighting under the leadership of Tautalus, but gradually acquired Roman culture and language; the Lusitanian cities, in a manner similar to those of the rest of the Romanised Iberian peninsula, eventually gained the status of "Citizens of Rome".

Culture 

Categorising Lusitanian culture generally, including the language, is proving difficult and contentious. Some believe it was essentially a pre-Celtic Iberian culture with substantial Celtic influences, while others argue that it was an essentially Celtic culture with strong indigenous pre-Celtic influences associated with the Beaker culture.

Religion 

The Lusitanians worshiped various gods in a very diverse polytheism, using animal sacrifice. They represented their gods and warriors in rudimentary sculpture. Endovelicus was the most important god for the Lusitanians. He is considered a possible Basque language loan god by some and, according to scholars like José Leite de Vasconcelos, the word Endovellicus was originally Celtic, Andevellicos. Endovelicus is compared with Welsh and Breton names, giving him the meaning of "Very Good God", the same epithet of the Irish god Dagda. Even the Romans worshiped him for his ability to protect. His cult eventually spread across the Iberian peninsula and beyond, to the rest of the Roman Empire and his cult was maintained until the fifth century; he was the god of public health and safety. 
The goddess Ataegina was especially popular in the south; as the goddess of rebirth (spring), fertility, nature, and cure, she was identified with Proserpina during the Roman era.

Lusitanian mythology was heavily influenced by or related to Celtic mythology. Also well attested in inscriptions are the names Bandua (one of the variants of Borvo) often with a second name linked to a locality such as Bandua Aetobrico, and Nabia, a goddess of rivers and streams.

According to Strabo the Lusitanians were given to offering sacrifices; they practiced divination on the sacrificial offering by inspecting its vitals and veins. They also sacrificed human victims, prisoners of war, by striking them under coarse blankets and observing which way they fell. They cut off the right hands of their captives, which they offered to the gods.

Language 

The Lusitanian language was a Paleohispanic language that clearly belongs to the Indo-European family.
The precise affiliation of the Lusitanian language inside the Indo-European family is still in debate: 
there are those who endorse that it is a para-Celtic language with an obvious Celticity to most of the lexicon, over many anthroponyms and toponyms. A second theory relates Lusitanian with the Italic languages; based on the names of Lusitanian deities with other grammatical elements of the area.

The Lusitanian language may in fact have been basal Italo-Celtic, a branch independent from Celtic and Italic, and splitting off early from Proto-Celtic and Proto-Italic populations who spread from Central Europe into western Europe after new Yamnaya migrations into the Danube Valley. Alternatively, a European branch of Indo-European dialects, termed "North-west Indo-European" and associated with the Beaker culture, may have been ancestral to not only Celtic and Italic, but also to Germanic and Balto-Slavic. Ellis Evans believes that Gallaecian - Lusitanian were one language (not separate languages) of the “P” Celtic variant.

Tribes 

The Lusitanians were a people formed by several tribes that lived between the rivers Douro and Tagus, in most of today's Beira and Estremadura regions of central Portugal, and some areas of the Extremadura region (Spain).

They were a tribal confederation, not a single political entity; each tribe had its own territory and was independent, and was formed by smaller clans. However, they had a cultural sense of unity and a common name for the tribes.

Each tribe was ruled by its own tribal aristocracy and chief. Many members of the Lusitanian tribal aristocracy were warriors as happened in many other pre-Roman peoples of the Iron Age.

Only when an external threat occurred did the different tribes politically unite, as happened at the time of the Roman conquest of their territory when Viriathus became the single leader of the Lusitanian tribes. Punicus, Caucenus and Caesarus were other important Lusitanian chiefs before the Roman conquest. They ruled the Lusitanians (before Viriathus) for some time, leading the tribes in the resistance against Roman attempts of conquest, and were successful.

The known Lusitanian tribes were:
 Arabrigenses
 Aravi
 Coelarni/Colarni
 Interamnienses
 Lancienses
 Lancienses Oppidani
 Lancienses Transcudani
 Ocelenses Lancienses
 Meidubrigenses
 Paesuri - Douro and Vouga (Portugal)
 Palanti (according to some scholars, these tribes were Lusitanians and not Vettones)
 Calontienses
 Caluri
 Coerenses
 Tangi
 Elbocori
 Igaeditani
 Tapori/Tapoli - River Tagus, around the border area of Portugal and Spain
 Talures

It remains to be known if the Turduli Veteres, Turduli Oppidani, Turduli Bardili, and Turduli were Lusitanian tribes (coastal tribes), were related Celtic peoples, or were instead related to the Turdetani (Celtic, pre-Celtic Indo-European, or Iberians) and came from the south. The name Turduli Veteres (older or ancient Turduli), a tribe that dwelt in today's Aveiro District, seems to indicate they came from the north and not from the south (contrary to what is assumed on the map). Several Turduli peoples were possibly Callaeci tribes that initially came from the north, towards the south along the coast and then migrated inland along the Tagus and the Anas (Guadiana River) valleys.

More Lusitanian tribes are likely, but their names are unknown.

Warfare 

The Lusitanians were considered by historians to be particularly adept at guerrilla warfare. The strongest amongst them were selected to defend the populace in mountainous sites. They used hooked javelins or saunions made of iron, and wielded swords and helmets like those of the Celtiberians. They threw their darts from some distance, yet often hit their marks and wounded their targets deeply. Being active and nimble warriors, they would pursue their enemies and decapitate them.

In times of peace, they had a particular style of dancing, which required great agility and nimbleness of the legs and thighs. In times of war, they marched in time, until they were ready to charge the enemy.

Appian claims that when Praetor Brutus sacked Lusitania after Viriathus's death, the women fought valiantly next to their men as women warriors.

Contemporary meaning 

Lusitanians are often used by Portuguese writers as a metonym for the Portuguese people, and similarly, Lusophone is used to refer to a Portuguese speaker.

Lusophone is at present a term used to categorize persons who share the linguistic and cultural traditions of the Portuguese-speaking nations and territories of Portugal, Brazil, Macau, Timor-Leste, Angola, Mozambique, Cape Verde, São Tomé and Príncipe, Guinea Bissau and others.

See also 
 History of Portugal
 Timeline of Portuguese history
 Beira Alta
 Beira Baixa
 Ribatejo
 Alentejo
 Extremadura
 Emerita Augusta, capital of the Roman province of Lusitania (Lusitaniae et Vetoniae)
 Hispania
 Lusitania (Roman province)
 Pre-Roman peoples of the Iberian Peninsula
 List of Celtic tribes
 List of Celtic place names in Portugal
 List of Ancient Peoples of Portugal
 National Archaeology Museum (Portugal)
 Roman Empire

Notes

References 

 Ángel Montenegro et alii, Historia de España 2 - colonizaciones y formación de los pueblos prerromanos (1200-218 a.C), Editorial Gredos, Madrid (1989) 
 Alarcão, Jorge de, O Domínio Romano em Portugal, Publicações Europa-América, Lisboa (1988) 
 Alarcão, Jorge de et alii, De Ulisses a Viriato – O primeiro milénio a.C., Museu Nacional de Arqueologia, Instituto Português de Museus, Lisboa (1996) 
 Amaral, João Ferreira do & Amaral, Augusto Ferreira do, Povos Antigos em Portugal – paleontologia do território hoje Português, Quetzal Editores, Lisboa (1997)

Further reading 

Amílcar Guerra, A propósito dos conceitos de "Lusitano" e "Lusitânia", Paleohispanica, 10, 81-98, Institución Fernando el Católico, Zaragoza (2010)  - 
 Berrocal-Rangel, Luis, Los pueblos célticos del soroeste de la Península Ibérica, Editorial Complutense, Madrid (1992) 
 Burillo Mozota, Francisco, Los Celtíberos, etnias y estados, Crítica, Barcelona (1998, revised edition 2007) 
 
 .
 Lorrio Alvarado, Alberto José, Los Celtíberos, Universidad Complutense de Madrid, Murcia (1997) 
 .

External links 

 Detailed map of the Pre-Roman Peoples of Iberia (around 200 BC)
 Unknown ancient author text (about Julius Caesar in Hispania) of De Bello Hispaniensi (Spanish War).
 Pliny the Elder text of Naturalis Historia (Natural History), books 3-6 (Geography and Ethnography).
 Strabo's text of De Geographica (The Geography).

 
Tribes of Lusitania
Historical Celtic peoples
Ancient peoples of Portugal
Indo-European peoples